There have been two baronetcies created for members of the Macdonald family, one in the Baronetage of Nova Scotia and one in the Baronetage of the United Kingdom. One creation is extant.

The Macdonald Baronetcy, later Bosville Macdonald Baronetcy, of Sleat in the Isle of Skye in the County of Inverness, was created in the Baronetage of Nova Scotia in 1625 for Donald Macdonald. The 9th baronet was created Baron Macdonald in 1776. In 1832, his male line failed after the death of the third Baron Macdonald, who had acquired the surname Bosville in 1813 by royal license after inheriting estates from his uncle. The current title holder, the 17th baronet, is chief of Clan Macdonald of Sleat.

The Macdonald Baronetcy, of East Sheen in the County of Surrey, was created in the Baronetage of the United Kingdom on 27 November 1813 for the judge and politician Archibald Macdonald. He was the posthumous son of the seventh Baronet of the 1625 creation. This title became extinct on the death of the fourth Baronet in 1919.

Macdonald baronets, of Sleat (1625)
Sir Donald Gorme Og Macdonald, 1st Baronet
Sir James Mor Macdonald, 2nd Baronet
Sir Donald Macdonald, 3rd Baronet (died 1695)
Sir Donald Macdonald, 4th Baronet (died 1718)
Sir Donald Macdonald, 5th Baronet (–1720)
Sir James Macdonald, 6th Baronet (died 1723)
Sir Alexander Macdonald, 7th Baronet (1711–1746)
Sir James Macdonald, 8th Baronet (–1766)
Sir Alexander Macdonald, 9th Baronet (c. 1745–1795) (created Baron Macdonald in 1776)

Barons Macdonald (1776)
Alexander Macdonald, 1st Baron Macdonald (–1795)
Alexander Wentworth Macdonald, 2nd Baron Macdonald (1773–1824)
Godfrey Macdonald, 3rd Baron Macdonald of Slate (1775–1832)

Bosville Macdonald baronets, of Sleat (1625); reverted 1832
Sir Alexander William Robert Bosville Macdonald, de jure 12th Baronet (1800–1847)
Sir Godfrey Wentworth Bayard Bosville, de jure 13th Baronet (1826–1865)
Sir Alexander Wentworth Macdonald Bosville Macdonald, 14th Baronet (1865–1933) (recognised in baronetcy in 1910)
Sir Godfrey Middleton Bosville Macdonald, 15th Baronet (1887–1951)
Sir Alexander Somerled Angus Bosville Macdonald, 16th Baronet (1917–1958)
Sir Ian Godfrey Bosville Macdonald, 17th Baronet (born 1947)

The heir apparent is the present holder's son Somerled Alexander Bosville Macdonald, Younger of Sleat (born 1976).
The heir apparent's heir apparent is his son Alexander William Bosville Macdonald (born 2005).

Macdonald baronets, of East Sheen (1813) 
Sir Archibald Macdonald, 1st Baronet (1747–1826)
Sir James Macdonald, 2nd Baronet (1784–1832)
Sir Archibald Keppel Macdonald, 3rd Baronet (1820–1901)
Sir Archibald John Macdonald, 4th Baronet (1871–1919)

References

Baronetcies in the Baronetage of Nova Scotia
East Sheen
Extinct baronetcies in the Baronetage of the United Kingdom
1625 establishments in Nova Scotia
1813 establishments in the United Kingdom